Plastingia is a genus of grass skipper butterflies in the family Hesperiidae.

Species
Plastingia naga (de Niceville, 1884) - chequered or silver-spot lancer
Plastingia pellonia Fruhstorfer, 1909 Burma, Thailand, Malaysia, Singapore, Borneo, Sumatra, Bangka, Java, Bali, Palawan
Plastingia flavescens (C. & R. Felder, [1867]) Celebes
Plastingia viburnia Semper, 1892  Philippines
Plastingia mangola Evans, 1949 Celebes
Plastingia tessellata (Hewitson, [1866]) Celebes
Plastingia titei Cantlie & Norman, 1960 Assam

Biology 
The larvae feed on Palmae including Caryota

References

Natural History Museum Lepidoptera genus database
Plastingia Butler, 1870 at Markku Savela's Lepidoptera and Some Other Life Forms

Hesperiinae
Hesperiidae genera